Matagorda may refer to:

Geography
 Matagorda, Texas, an unincorporated community in Texas
Matagorda Bay, on the coast of Texas
Matagorda County, Texas
Matagorda Independent School District in Matagorda County, Texas
Matagorda Island, a barrier island on the coast of Texas
Matagorda Island State Park, on Matagorda Island in Texas
The Matagorda Peninsula in Texas

Military and Naval
United States Air Force
Matagorda Island Air Force Base, a base in Texas active during World War II and from 1949 to 1975
United States Coast Guard
USCGC Matagorda, the name of more than one United States Coast Guard ship
United States Navy
USS Matagorda (AVP-22), a seaplane tender in commission from 1941 to 1946